Helicopter Combat Support Squadron Seven (HC-7) was a helicopter squadron of the United States Navy established on 1 September 1967 and disestablished on 30 June 1975.

History
Helicopter Combat Support Squadron ONE, (HC-1) was reorganized to create several additional helicopter squadrons. The existing HC-1 Detachments based at NAS Atsugi and NAAF Ream Field, Naval Outlying Landing Field Imperial Beach were redesignated Helicopter Combat Support Squadron SEVEN (HC-7). Established with sixteen officers and seventy-five enlisted men on 1 September 1967. Upon establishment, HC-7 was tasked with multiple missions including Logistics, Vertical Replenishment, Seventh Fleet Flagship, Aerial Mine Countermeasure, Oceanographic, home station search and rescue (SAR) and combat search and rescue (CSAR).

Volunteer crewmen attended Combat Aircrewman Rescue School which included training in  “JEST”, SERE (search, evasion, resistance, and escape), combat swim school, aerial gunnery/weapons, medical, hand-to-hand combat, 10’-10 mph helo rescue swimmer deployment. HC-7 owed its success to the establishment of the training instructors of “Paramedic Rescue Team ONE”, NAS Cubi Point, Republic of Philippines.

During Operation Rolling Thunder the Navy maintained units in the Gulf of Tonkin to retrieve downed fliers from the sea and from North Vietnam and Laos. Normally, two destroyers were deployed to the forward, North SAR Station and another two to the South SAR Station. To carry out rescues in North Vietnam's lethal environment, one UH-2 Seasprite helicopter equipped with self-sealing fuel tanks, machine guns, and armor was placed on board a ship at each station. Another four similarly armed and armored SH-3A Sea Kings (the primary rescue helicopter) were based on one of the Yankee Station carriers.

As the Vietnam War intensified the squadron deployed 16 separate detachments, constantly on the move, branded with the nickname “The Orphans of the Seventh Fleet”. HC-7 helicopters Cross-decked to a new ship on an average of 14 day to a new home as the host ships departed the Gulf of Tonkin. HC-7 was continuously stationed in the Gulf of Tonkin (Squadron, 2216 days – Det 110, 2046 days). HC-7 crews rescued 150 persons, 130 of which were within the Vietnam Combat zone. Two pilots were rescued twice. Five successful rescues took place deep within North Vietnam (feet dry), many rescues occurred along the coast (feet wet) within range of heavy enemy artillery. One of its members, Lieutenant (junior grade) Clyde Everett Lassen received the Medal of Honor. In July 1971 HC-7 was awarded Presidential Unit Citation for the period 1 September 1967 to 30 April 1969 for Extraordinary Heroism.

Detachments
Beginning with two detachments, increasing to high of sixteen during 1969 then in 1971 as the requirements changed HC-7 condensed to one detachment (110). 

Detachment 101 – UH-2A/B – (1970 UH-2C) Seasprite – Blackbeard One – aboard flag ships  and  primary flights for Commander of Seventh Fleet.  VIP, non-VIP, mail transfer flights 10 crewmen, rotation of 30–60 days from 1 September 1967 to 1971.

Detachment 102 – UH-46 Sea Knight – Vertical Replenishment – aboard , two UH-46s, 22-24 crewmen, rotation of 30–60 days. Continued operations 1 September 1967, departed 27 April 1970 to HC-3.  Recorded operations of a 1968 cruise, 79 ships supplied with 943 tons of stores. Also, transporting supplies to inland bases located at Vung Tau, South Vietnam.

Detachment 103 – 1 October 1967, HC-7 assumed duties from HC-1 Detachment Cubi, 1 January 1968- Det 103 Cubi assumed station SAR for NAS Cubi Point. 1 September 1968 redesignated “HC-7 Det Cubi” (configuration / repair / training center, staging area for CSAR detachments). The only permanent detachment. Beginning with 2 officers and 25 enlisted men. Last muster entry 8 August 1974.

Detachments 104, 105, 106, 107, 108 and 109 – UH-2A later HH-2C Seasprite Clementine – Combat Search and Rescue (CSAR). 1 September 1967 to 1971 Stationed aboard DLGs and DDs – North and South CSAR stations. 8-10 crewmen, 30-60 day rotation. Cross-decking on a minimal time frame. Also deployed during the North Korea 1969 EC-121 shootdown incident 15 April 1969.

Detachments 110 and 111 stationed aboard the Yankee Station host carrier. From 18 February 1968 to 24 September 1973, these detachments were continuously (2045 days) stationed in the Gulf of Tonkin. Formed from HS-6's six helicopters aboard . Normally 5-6 helicopters and 35-55 men, with all repair equipment, tools, gear, taking four to five flights each. Det 110/111 completed 142 cross decks. Big Mothers pre-positioned prior to air strikes and co-existed with the Clementine crews aboard North and South SAR.

Detachment 110 – HH-3A Sea King – Big Mothers – Combat Search and Rescue (CSAR), approximately 35-55 crewmen and 5 helos, (3 CSAR and 2 Logistic) From 18 February 1968 to 25 September 1973.

Detachment 111 – SH-3A Sea King – Protector – logistics flights aboard host carriers (with Big Mothers).

Detachment 112 – UH-46 Sea Knight– Vertical Replenishment – aboard , two UH-46s, 22-24 crewmen, rotation of 40–60 days. Commenced operations 1 January 1969, departed 6 September 1970 to HC-3.

Detachment 113 -RH-3A Sea King – Aerial Mine Counter Measures – aboard , two RH-3As, 32-36 crewmen, rotation of 30–60 days. Mine Manglers arrived 19 February 1969, departed for HC-5 12 August 1970. Provided aerial mine sweeping operation throughout Southeast Asia, and SEATO exercises.

Detachment 114 – No record data.

Detachment 115 – H-34 SeaHorse - logistic support aboard oceanographic ship, South Korea, three deployments during the Spring and Summer of 1969.

Detachment 116 – SH-3A Sea King EC-121 shootdown incident

Chronology

1967
14 rescues (3 combat, 11 others), 7 helicopters (1220 flight hours)

4 October diverted from an inland attempt, Clementine crew rescues a pilot amongst the cargo ships within Haiphong harbor. The next day, 5 October  three attempts to grab inland pilot, code word “LAMB”, pilot captured, crew shot down helicopter ditched and crew rescued.

14 October just off of the coast helicopter crew beats out many sampans, second still in raft, helo pilot uses rotor wash to trap raft, crewman drops horse-collar in his lap.

1968

42 rescues (17 combat, 25 others). Staffing (July) 66 officers, 399 enlisted. 12 helicopters (6950 flight hours)

15 April heavy artillery, four crewman rescued, swimmers use D ring, hoist pilot and self with one lift.

14 May Lieutenant Terry Lee Smith, AE1 Robert Harold Dabel and AO3 Carl Delbert Martin perished when their UH-2A helicopter crashed at HC-7 Det Cubi - NAS Cubi Point

Co-pilot M-16s expended rounds hit pilot in face. A-4s suppress flak.

1969

No command report available 13 rescues (0 combat, 13 others)
Staffing – (July) 105 Officers – 562 Enlisted – 24 helos

16 January LT Clyde E. Lassen presented Congressional Medal of Honor by President Lyndon Johnson.

January 1969 HC-7 developed “CSAR Operations and Procedures”; check list, team effort, prepared for unexpected – should not be committed into hostile environment until survivor is located, identified and information, RESCAP available throughout the entire mission. Fly no lower than the highest column that may result from exploding enemy ordnance. “Swimmer in the water” technique ( altitude/10 knots). Deploy smoke canister as a diversion for artillery shelling, Jinking will reduce the possibility of battle damage. Today, this documentation is supplementing CSAR training within Navy helicopter squadrons. October 1974, HC-7's experiences were compiled within a manual “Combat Search and Rescue Tactics”.

1970

19 rescues (13 combat (classified), 6 others) Staffing (July) 80 officers, 492 enlisted, 35 helicopters  (2660 flight hours)(1017 VIPS)

20 February AZ3 Scott Ferris Moore Jr passenger, perished when an SH-3A helicopter crashed near  on Yankee Station.

12 August first (and only) rescue by HC-7 HH-2C, helicopter airborne before pilot hit the water

Naval helicopter squadrons utilize maintenance facilities at HC-7 Det Cubi.  HH-3A helos arrive at Det Cubi, having design problems, were not operational by years’ end.

Date unknown inland (classified) rescue/recovery of nine Republic of Vietnam Navy Nasty boat crewmen – sunk boat. Three wounded, three dead.

1971 
One rescue (1 combat, 0 other). Staffing (July) 54 officers, 306 enlisted, 47 helicopters.

30 December heavy shelling – badly injured pilot just off enemy island, deploy swimmer, assist pilot, North Vietnamese boats, RESCAP strafed, exploding artillery, large track gun appears from cave on island, rescue hoist cable broke, was debris field, helicopter lands in water – recover swimmer, pull him in, vertical lift, dodging explosions. Search for second pilot unsuccessful, many boats, forced to exit.

1972
58 rescues (45 combat, 13 others). Staffing (July) 49 officers, 277 enlisted, 25 helicopters (4951 flight hours)

9 April CSAR flights doubled – 2-4 helicopters launched to preposition locations for each air strike

12 April mini detachment sent from USA to Tonkin Gulf aboard 

9 May Operation Linebacker begins. Within ten days four helicopters and 138 personnel deployed to Western Pacific. All Navy HH-3As transferred to HC-7. To expedite a United States Air Force C-5A air-lifts two helicopters to Det Cubi.

24 May found wreckage, RESCAP gave vector 50/1, continued, day smoke, swimmer dropped, drop coiled cable, “D” rings attached, pick-up, frayed cable seriously injured crewman's hand, directed to nearest ship for medical attention.

May–June Operation Thunderhead potential POW recovery flight path along North Vietnam coast line, within estuaries, searching for AGENTS, two weeks, lost SEAL teams from  found and rescued no POWs. Canceled.

HC-7 maintained 2 helicopters for worldwide CSAR to be dispatched on a 48-hour notice

Continued development of rescue technics (Special Projects): chaff and flare dispensing systems, N2 Laser/Dye Marker search system, Emergency Low Visibility Approach System, new snap link and rescue swimmer check list, mini gun syllabus, anti-aircraft fire control warning, voice encryption, electronic location finder.

1973
2 rescues (0 combat, 2 other). Staffing (July) 56 officers, 242 enlisted, 25 helicopters.

14 January last CSAR mission.

February–March Det 110 provided SAR backup for Operation End Sweep the demining of Haiphong harbor and plane guard flights for host carrier.

24 September the last cross-deck , departs the war zone, steaming east to Naval Base Subic Bay. Det Cubi continued CSAR contingency readiness training.

1974

0 rescues. Staffing (January) 53 officers, 262 enlisted, 23 helicopters.

21 May Det Cubi sends aircraft and personnel to Naval Outlying Landing Field Imperial Beach closing HC-7's part in the Vietnam War. HC-7 continues mission readiness and training.

1975
1 rescue. Staffing (January) 31 officers, 167 enlisted, 8 helicopters.

8 April Last rescue NAS Fallon, Nevada, While conducting SAR training an F-8 Crusader pilot had ejected. The Big Mother crew, a joint squadron team, HC-7, HC-1 and HC-2. 

May HC-7 to be disestablished.

June transfers of men and equipment completed.

HC-7 lost six helicopters, Three UH-2A/Bs (1 combat shot down, 1 self shot down, 1 fuel starvation) Two H-46s (each having engine failure) and one SH-3A (tail system failure).

Commanding officers
CDR Lloyd L. Parthemer 1 September 1967 to 24 September 1968 
CDR Ronald N. Hipp 24 September 1968 to 16 September 1969
CDR Donald G. Gregory 16 September 1969 to 11 September 1970
CDR Gerald L. Glade 11 September 1970 to 4 August 1971
CDR John E. Woolam 4 August 1971 to 6 July 1972
CDR David J. McCracken 6 July 1972 to 27 July 1973
CDR Billy C. Lamberth 27 July 1973 to 26 July 1974
CDR Walter B. Lester 26 July 1974 to 30 June 1975

Insignia
HC-7's insignia has a central focal point Cerberus who acclaimed as one of the most feared creatures in Greek and Roman mythology. The three heads attached to a single body symbolize the three basic missions of the squadron: rescue, vertical replenishment and utility. The gold circle surrounding the insignia represents a halo, hence the downed aviators reference to the rescue helicopter an “angel”. The insignia was approved in August 1968.

Aircraft

19 Kaman UH-2A/B (Sea Sprite)
5 Kaman UH-2C (Sea Sprite)
7 Kaman HH-2C-D (Sea Sprite)
33 Sikorsky SH-3A-G (Sea King)
12 Sikorsky HH-3A (Sea King)
3 Sikorsky RH-3A (Sea King)
12 Boeing UH-46A-D (Sea Knight)
1 Sikorsky UH-34 (Sea Horse) 

92 aircraft in total

HC-7 helicopter armament included M16 rifles, M79 grenade launchers, M60 machine guns. In 1970 Big Mother H-3s were modified installing a GAU-2B/A minigun upon armor plated mount in right rear aft cargo door. The HH-2Cs  arrived having a chin mounted minigun turret system, no guns were ever received. With essential CSAR equipment installed, to remain below the 12,500-pound max., the turret system was removed. Fuel and CSAR equipment had priority over the minigun. M60 machine guns were mounted in the cargo doors. The H-3s were tested with minigun pods mounded exterior aft, which proved to be too heavy for the existing climate of the war zone.

References

Aircraft squadrons of the United States Navy
Helicopter combat support squadrons of the United States Navy